Moving on the Edges of Things is an EP by the American band This Will Destroy You. It was released on August 10, 2010 through Magic Bullet Records, although it was available on the label's website from July. It was released on 12" vinyl, with the first, and currently only, pressing limited to 1000 copies.

Track listing

Personnel 
This Will Destroy You
 Jeremy Galindo - guitar
 Donovan Jones - bass, keyboard
 Chris King - guitar
 Alex Bhore - drums

Production
 Alex Bhore - audio recorder and mixer
 Chris King - additional recording
 Rob Wechsler - mastering

References 

2010 EPs
This Will Destroy You EPs